Publius Cornelius P.f. P.n. Scipio (living circa 211 BC/205 BC–170 BC) was the eldest son of Scipio Africanus and his wife Aemilia Paulla.  He was chosen augur from 180 BC. Little information on him survives, as he did not stand for any of the high offices or have a public career of note. Cicero relates that he was in poor health, the particulars of which he refuses to mention, stating that "we ought not to reproduce ... their faults (of ancestors)." Scipio died young from his poor health.

Scipio had no natural progeny. For remedy according to Roman custom he adopted as son and heir his first cousin Scipio Aemilianus (b. 185 BC) who was probably born Lucius Aemilius Paullus, second and younger surviving son of Lucius Aemilius Paullus Macedonicus by his first wife Papiria Masonis. This adoption probably took place after his brother Lucius died childless. Thereafter the son used the name Publius Cornelius Scipio Aemilianus Africanus.

Cicero adds that the eldest son of Scipio Africanus had "more ample intellectual culture" than his father and that the state endured a loss in his not being able to seek high office.

Notes

References

3rd-century BC Romans
2nd-century BC Roman augurs
Publius
Roman patricians